Frédéric Mitterrand (born 21 August 1947) is a French politician who served as Minister of Culture and Communication of France from 2009 to 2012 under President Nicolas Sarkozy. Throughout his career, he has been an actor, screenwriter, television presenter, writer, producer and director.

Biography 

Born in Paris, he is the nephew of François Mitterrand, who was the president of France from 1981 to 1995, and the son of engineer Robert Mitterrand (1915–2002) and Edith Cahier, the niece of Eugène Deloncle, the co-founder of "La Cagoule".

He attended the Lycée Janson de Sailly in Paris and studied history and geography at the Paris West University Nanterre La Défense, and political science at Sciences Po. He taught economics, history and geography at EABJM from 1968 to 1971. In 1978, he was a film critic at J'informe. From 1971 to 1986, he ran several art film cinemas in Paris (Olympic Palace, Entrepôt and Olympic-Entrepôt). He also had roles in a number of films, and in the 1980s was active as a producer and director in TV productions.

In June 2008, Mitterrand was appointed as the director of the French Academy in Rome by President Nicolas Sarkozy.

A year later, on 23 June 2009, Mitterrand was appointed to the French government as the Minister of Culture and Communications until May 2012.

Mitterrand, who is openly bisexual, writes a monthly column for Têtu.

The Bad Life 
Mitterrand's autobiographical novel The Bad Life was a best seller in 2005. In the book he details his "delight" whilst visiting the male brothels of Bangkok, and writes, "I got into the habit of paying for boys ... The profusion of young, very attractive and immediately available boys put me in a state of desire I no longer needed to restrain or hide."  At the time of its release Mitterrand was applauded for his honesty, but he has had to defend his writings after he publicly defended Roman Polanski when Polanski was detained in Switzerland on an American request for extradition for raping a thirteen-year-old girl.

On 5 October 2009, Marine Le Pen of the French National Front Party quoted sections of the book on French television, accusing him of having sex with underage boys and engaging in "sex tourism", demanding that Mitterrand resign his position as culture minister. Amongst others he was also criticised by the Socialist Party spokesman Benoît Hamon, who stated: "As a minister of culture he has drawn attention to himself by defending a film maker and he has written a book where he said he took advantage of sexual tourism. To say the least, I find it shocking." On the other hand, some conservatives supported Mitterrand, and a close aide to Nicolas Sarkozy said the French President backed his Culture Minister, describing the controversy around him as "pathetic".

Mitterrand insisted the book is not an autobiography, the publisher describes it as a "novel inspired by autobiography" and the BBC refers to it as "autobiographical novel". In his own defence Mitterrand stated, "Each time I was with people who were my age, or who were five years younger – there wasn't the slightest ambiguity – and who were consenting", and that he uses the term "boys" loosely, both in his life and in the book. He also declared, "I condemn sexual tourism, which is a disgrace. I condemn paedophilia, which I have never in any way participated in."

Filmography 

Actor
 1960: Fortunat
 1992: La collection secrète de Salvador Dalí by Otto Kelmer<ref>12e Festival International du Film sur l´Art 8-13 mars 1994, Commanditaire Officiel (in French & English). Montréal: Pratt & Whitney Canada, 1994, p.35.</ref>
 1997: Mon copain Rachid, by Philippe Barassat
 1998: Que la lumière soit, by Arthur Joffé
 2001: Le Fabuleux Destin d'Amélie Poulain by Jean-Pierre Jeunet

Director
 1981: Lettres d'amour en Somalie 1984: Paris vu par… vingt ans plus tard 1995: Madame Butterfly, adaption of the Puccini opera

Producer
 Les Aigles foudroyés, documentary
 Mémoires d'exil, documentary
 Fairouz, documentary, 1998
 Je suis la Folle de Brejnev, 2001
 FARAH: The Last Empress, documentary 2009

 Publications 
 Tous désirs confondus, Actes Sud, 1988, new ed. 2009
 Mémoires d'exil, Robert Laffont, 1990, 
 Destins d'étoiles – tomes 1, 2, 3, 4 – Fixot, 1991–1992
 Monte Carlo: la légende, Assouline, 1993
 Une saison tunisienne, sous la direction de Frédéric Mitterrand et Soraya Elyes-Ferchichi, Actes Sud, 1995
 L'Ange bleu: un film de Joseph von Sternberg, Plume, 1995
 Madame Butterfly, Plume, 1995
 Les Aigles foudroyés – la fin des Romanov des Habsbourg et des Hohenzollern, Pocket, 1998
 Un jour dans le siècle, Robert Laffont, 2000
 La Mauvaise Vie, Robert Laffont, 2005
 Lettres d'amour en Somalie, Pocket, September 2006
 Maroc, 1900–1960 Un certain regard, avec Abdellah Taïa, Actes Sud, 2007
 Le Festival de Cannes, Robert Laffont, 2007
 Le désir et la chance, Robert Laffont, 2012
 La récréation'', Robert Laffont, 2013

Honours

National honours 
 : Former Chancellor Officer of the Order of the Legion of Honour
 : Former Chancellor Officer of the National Order of Merit
 : Former Chancellor Commander of the Order of Arts and Letters, 1st Class

Foreign honours 
 : Knight Officer of the Order of Cultural Merit
  Romanian Royal Family: Knight Commander of the Order of the Crown
  Romanian Royal Family: Knight of the Royal Decoration of the Cross of the Romanian Royal House

References

External links 

 
(In French) A passage from Mitterrand's autobiography, "La Mauvaise Vie" (Edition Robert Laffont, 360 p., 2005), pages 293 à 307. publisher LeMonde.Fr

1947 births
Living people
Male actors from Paris
Bisexual male actors
Bisexual politicians
French bisexual writers
French male film actors
French film directors
French film producers
French Ministers of Culture
French male screenwriters
French screenwriters
French television presenters
French television producers
LGBT film directors
LGBT television directors
French LGBT politicians
French LGBT screenwriters
François Mitterrand
Lycée Janson-de-Sailly alumni
Sciences Po alumni
Officers of the Order of Cultural Merit (Monaco)
Officers of the Ordre national du Mérite
Recipients of the Order of the Crown (Romania)
Commanders of the Order of the Crown (Romania)
Commandeurs of the Ordre des Arts et des Lettres
20th-century French writers
21st-century French writers
21st-century French politicians
University of Paris alumni
Mitterrand family